Terra Nova was a whaler and polar expedition ship. She is best known for carrying the 1910 British Antarctic Expedition, Robert Falcon Scott's last expedition.

Construction
Terra Nova (Latin for "new land") was built in 1884 for the Dundee whaling and sealing fleet. She was ideally suited to the polar regions and worked for 10 years in the annual seal fishery in the Labrador Sea, proving her worth for many years before she was called upon for expedition work.

Expedition relief
In 1903, she sailed in company with fellow ex-whaler  to assist in freeing the National Antarctic Expedition's  from McMurdo Sound. On return to Great Britain, expedition leader Commander Robert Falcon Scott was promoted to the rank of captain.

On return from the Antarctic, Terra Nova was purchased by the American millionaire William Ziegler and placed under the command of a Norwegian, Captain Johan Kjeldsen. She sailed to the Arctic to return members of the US Fiala/Ziegler expedition from Franz Josef Land to Norway. This expedition had lost its ship America, crushed by ice, during an attempt to reach the North Pole.

After returning to Newfoundland in 1906, Terra Nova resumed sealing duties with her owners, C. T. Bowring & Co. of St. John's and Liverpool.

British Antarctic Expedition, 1910

In 1909, Terra Nova was bought by Captain R.F. Scott RN for the sum of £12,500, as expedition ship for the British Antarctic Expedition 1910. Reinforced from bow to stern with seven feet of oak to protect against the Antarctic ice pack, she sailed from Cardiff Docks on 15 June 1910 under overall command of Captain Scott. He described her as "a wonderfully fine ice ship.... As she bumped the floes with mighty shocks, crushing and grinding a way through some, twisting and turning to avoid others, she seemed like a living thing fighting a great fight".

Although the twenty-four officers and scientific staff made valuable observations in biology, geology, glaciology, meteorology, and geophysics along the coast of Victoria Land and on the Ross Ice Shelf, Scott's last expedition is best remembered for the death of Scott and four companions.

After wintering at Cape Evans on Ross Island, Scott, Henry Bowers, Edgar Evans, Lawrence Oates, and Edward Wilson set out on a race to be the first men at the South Pole. Starting with tractors and Mongolian ponies, the final  had to be covered by man-hauling alone. Reaching the South Pole on 17 January 1912, they found that Roald Amundsen's expedition (based on Fram) had beaten them by thirty-four days. Worse was to come, as all five men died on the return journey. The frozen bodies of three were discovered eight months later, in November 1912. Their journals and papers were found and retrieved.

Later career

After returning from the Antarctic in 1913, Terra Nova was purchased by her former owners and resumed work in the Newfoundland seal fishery. Estimates for her career as a sealing vessel is over 800,000 seal pelts. In 1918 she was charted by the Dominion Steel and Coal Corporation to transport coal from the coal mines at North Sydney to Bell Island.

In 1942, Terra Nova was chartered by Newfoundland Base Contractors to carry supplies to base stations in Greenland. On 12 September 1943 at 2205, the vessel sent an SOS reporting damage, that water was over the boilers and pumps were not working. The US Coast Guard Cutters Atak, Amarok, Laurel, and Manitou, all part of the Greenland Patrol of the US Atlantic Fleet, responded. Atak reached Terra Nova on 13 September. They rescued all personnel aboard and set the ship alight before proceeding to Narsarssuak, Greenland. Amarok and Manitou turned back after their services were not needed. Laurel proceeded to the site of Terra Nova.

Artifacts
The figurehead from Terra Nova was removed in 1913 and presented to Cardiff City Council which in 1932 donated it to the National Museum of Wales. Her bell is kept at the Scott Polar Research Institute, part of the University of Cambridge. It was given to the institute on 20 October 1952 by Lady Nicholson of Eden, who was given the bell by her nephew, EL Atkinson, the surgeon on Scott's last expedition. The bell is rung every weekday at 10.30 and 16.00 when everyone working within the institute is invited to gather for coffee in the morning and tea in the afternoon, as is the British tradition. It is rung in the manner of a ship's watch, five bells in the morning and eight bells in the afternoon.

The binnacle of Terra Nova is displayed in the Pierhead Suite of the Pierhead Building, Cardiff Bay, a short distance from the point where Scott's crew departed Cardiff on the fated voyage.

In July 2012, the wreck of Terra Nova was discovered by the Schmidt Ocean Institute’s flagship RV Falkor.

See also
 List of Antarctic exploration ships from the Heroic Age, 1897–1922

References 
   

The Terra Nova was mentioned in a sailing song: The Balena.

External links 

 Footage of Terra Nova in Cardiff in 1913

1884 establishments in the United Kingdom
1884 ships
2012 archaeological discoveries
Bowring Brothers
Exploration ships of the United Kingdom
Maritime incidents in September 1943
Sealing ships
Ships built in Dundee
Shipwrecks in the Arctic Ocean
Shipwrecks in the Greenland Sea
Terra Nova expedition
Water transport in Newfoundland and Labrador
Whaling ships
Robert Falcon Scott